Sandy Jacobson (born 23 March 1966) is a Canadian long-distance runner. In 2001, she competed in the women's marathon at the 2001 World Championships in Athletics held in Edmonton, Alberta, Canada. She finished in 34th place.

In 2003, she competed in the women's marathon at the 2003 World Championships in Athletics held in Paris, France. She finished in 28th place.

References

External links 
 
 

Living people
1966 births
Place of birth missing (living people)
Canadian female long-distance runners
Canadian female marathon runners
World Athletics Championships athletes for Canada
20th-century Canadian women
21st-century Canadian women